João Lopes may refer to:

 João Lopes Bank, Portuguese seamount in Santa Maria, Portugal
 João Simões Lopes Neto (1865-1916), Brazilian regionalist writer
 João Lopes (equestrian) (1919-2015), Portuguese equestrian
 João Lopes Marques (born 1971), Portuguese-Estonian writer and blogger
 João Lopes Filho (born 1943), Cape Verdean anthropologist and historian
 João Pimenta Lopes (born 1980), Portuguese politician
 João Lopes (footballer) (born 1996), Brazilian footballer